George Stretton (1901–1955) was a British cinematographer.

Selected filmography
 Song of the Plough (1933)
 She Was Only a Village Maiden (1933)
 Lest We Forget (1934)
 Colonel Blood (1934)
 Menace (1934)
 Maria Marten, or The Murder in the Red Barn (1935)
 Lieut. Daring R.N. (1935)
 Rolling Home (1935)
 Emil and the Detectives (1935)
 Honeymoon for Three (1935)
 Prison Breaker (1936)
 Jury's Evidence (1936)
 It's You I Want (1936)
 The Interrupted Honeymoon (1936)
 Big Fella (1937)
 The Live Wire (1937)
 Melody and Romance (1937)
 It's a Grand Old World (1937)
 Fine Feathers (1937)
 Calling All Stars (1937)
 Blondes for Danger (1938)
 The Return of the Frog (1938)
 I've Got a Horse (1938)
 The Mind of Mr. Reeder (1939)
 Under the Frozen Falls (1948)
 Poet's Pub (1949)
 Floodtide (1949)
 Prelude to Fame (1950)

Bibliography
 Low, Rachael. ''History of the British Film: Filmmaking in 1930s Britain. George Allen & Unwin, 1985 .

External links

1901 births
1955 deaths
British cinematographers
People from Cranbrook, Kent